Laurent Batlles (born 23 September 1975) is a French former professional footballer who played as a midfielder, currently head coach of  club Saint-Étienne.

Playing career
Batlles was born in Nantes. In 1993, he emerged from the Toulouse academy into the senior squad, playing his first game in Ligue 1 on 2 April 1994 in a 1–0 away loss against Lyon.

In 1999, after scoring ten league goals in six seasons, two spent in Ligue 2, Batlles signed with Bordeaux, where he took part in exactly half of 1999–2000's league fixtures, adding eight appearances in the side's run in the UEFA Champions League, netting once. The following campaign he scored three in 32 matches, featuring in 19 league games in 2001–02 – six in the UEFA Cup – before completing the latter season at Rennes.

In January 2003, Batlles moved to Corsica and Bastia. He played the remaining 19 fixtures for his new team, a figure he repeated in the first half of 2003–04 (without scoring) before joining Marseille, in another January transfer window move.

Batlles contributed eight matches in l'OMs runner-up run in the UEFA Cup including the final, lost 2–0 to Valencia. The following season he scored eight goals in 30 games and, after starting 2005–06 at the Stade Vélodrome, rejoined Toulouse following problems with manager Jean Fernandez.

Batlles joined permanently in the 2006–07 campaign after a successful loan spell, although he had a contract with Marseille until June 2008. Again, he was an undisputed starter, as Toulouse finished third in the league and reached the third qualifying round of the Champions League, eventually bowing out to Liverpool.

In 2008–09, the 33-year-old Batlles joined newly promoted club Grenoble on a two-year deal, being first choice as it eventually retained its top-flight status. In June 2010, after being relegated, he was released, quickly signing for Saint-Étienne – the first team placed above the relegation zone – at nearly 35 years of age.

Coaching career
Batlles retired from football in May 2012, with a total of 473 French top-tier games and 41 goals. He continued working with his last club, as a technical supervisor.

In June 2019, Batlles was announced as the new coach of Troyes, joining on a two-year contract. He led them back to the top flight in 2021 after a three-year absence, as champions.

Batlles left on 30 December 2021, after falling out with owners City Football Group. He agreed to a two-year deal at recently-relegated Saint-Étienne on 3 June 2022.

Managerial statistics

Honours
PlayerMarseilleUEFA Intertoto Cup: 2005

ManagerTroyes'
Ligue 2: 2020–21

References

External links

1975 births
Living people
French footballers
Footballers from Nantes
Association football midfielders
Ligue 1 players
Ligue 2 players
Toulouse FC players
FC Girondins de Bordeaux players
Stade Rennais F.C. players
SC Bastia players
Olympique de Marseille players
Grenoble Foot 38 players
AS Saint-Étienne players
France youth international footballers
France under-21 international footballers
French football managers
Ligue 1 managers
Ligue 2 managers
ES Troyes AC managers
AS Saint-Étienne managers